The Chimney Fire was a wildfire in the Santa Lucia Range, within San Luis Obispo County, California. The fire temporarily closed Hearst Castle to tourists and also forced the closure of Highway 1 along the scenic Big Sur coast for a time. By the time the fire was contained on September 6, 2016 it had burned  acres of land.

Timeline
The fire was first reported Saturday August 13 shortly after 4:00 p.m. Evacuations were ordered in the area of Running Deer Ranch, located on the south side of Lake Nacimiento.

On Sunday afternoon the 14th, officials announced that Highway 1 would be closed for at least 24 hours due to fire activity. Dry south-west winds and temperatures approaching  drove the fire.

At a briefing on Monday morning, August 15, officials warned that the area had not burned since the 1960s meaning there is a significant amount of dry, flammable brush that could cause dramatic fire behavior. Officials from CAL FIRE also stated that at least 20 homes had been damaged or destroyed, but made clear that the extent of the damage would not be known until crews could enter the burned areas to make a full assessment.

At  on Saturday afternoon with 35% containment, the fire was within  of Hearst Castle. Tours were cancelled as park staff prepared to move some of the massive art and antiques collection if necessary. No artwork was in any immediate danger, and did not have to be moved.

On August 26, thirteen days after the fire started, the fire neared being half contained, i.e., 49 residences and 21 other structures were destroyed, nearly 1900 other structures were threatened,  had been burned, and it was 47% contained.

On August 31, the fire had burned   and was 85% contained. All evacuation orders and road closures had been lifted by this point. Firefighting efforts had begun to slow, although the smoke in surrounding areas was still considerably thick by then.

On September 6th, the fire was fully contained having been ongoing for the previous 23 days. Over 70 buildings were destroyed and 8 buildings were damaged because of the fire, yet only one injury had occurred.

References

2016 California wildfires
Wildfires in San Luis Obispo County, California
Santa Lucia Range
Los Padres National Forest